The eighth and penultimate season of the American dramatic television series Touched by an Angel aired CBS from September 29, 2001 through May 11, 2002, spanning 22 episodes. Created by John Masius and produced by Martha Williamson, the series chronicled the cases of two angels, Monica (Roma Downey) and her supervisor Tess (Della Reese), who bring messages from God to various people to help them as they reach a crossroads in their lives. They are frequently joined by Andrew (John Dye), the angel of death. In this penultimate season, a new trainee angel, Gloria (Valerie Bertinelli) is also added to the cast.

The episodes use the song "Walk with You", performed by Reese, as their opening theme.

Episodes

External links
 
 
 

Touched by an Angel seasons
2001 American television seasons
2002 American television seasons